The 2005 German Grand Prix (officially the Formula 1 Grosser Mobil 1 Preis von Deutschland 2005) was a Formula One motor race held on 24 July 2005 in the Hockenheimring, Hockenheim, Germany at 14:00 CEST (UTC+2). The 67-lap race was the twelfth round of the 2005 Formula One season. Renault driver Fernando Alonso won the race, taking his sixth victory of the season, whilst Juan Pablo Montoya finished second for the McLaren team. BAR-Honda driver Jenson Button, completed the podium by finishing in third position.

As a consequence of the race, Alonso extended his lead in the Drivers' Championship by 10 points to 36 points over his main title rival, McLaren driver Kimi Räikkönen, who had retired from the lead of the race, but still remained second in the standings. Ferrari driver and reigning world champion Michael Schumacher, finished the race in fifth position and retained third place in the standings, albeit being 40 points behind Alonso. Juan Pablo Montoya was still in fourth, and Rubens Barichello remained fifth despite finishing out of the points. In the Constructors' Championship, Renault extended their lead to 22 points from title rivals McLaren. McLaren increased the gap between themselves and third placed Ferrari to 17 points, whilst Toyota and Williams remained fourth and fifth respectively.

Friday drivers 
The bottom 6 teams in the 2004 Constructors' Championship were entitled to run a third car in free practice on Friday. These drivers drove on Friday but did not compete in qualifying or the race.

Report
Kimi Räikkönen qualified first and maintained this position after the start and first round of pitstops. Meanwhile, his teammate Juan Pablo Montoya, had gained nine positions in the first lap after he had failed to set a qualifying time and started last on the grid.

However, on lap 35, Räikkönen's car suffered a hydraulics failure forcing his retirement from the race. This meant that Fernando Alonso inherited first position. It was Räikkönen's fifth consecutive retirement at the circuit. Michael Schumacher and Rubens Barrichello suffered from the poor durability of the Bridgestone tyres on their Ferraris again, particularly Schumacher who had chosen a softer compound. This allowed Jenson Button to overtake Schumacher to take second place, although he quickly pitted, allowing Montoya take gain the position. Montoya then managed to stay ahead of Button after his own second stop. In the final laps of the race, Schumacher's problems allowed Giancarlo Fisichella to take his fourth place. During the race Jacques Villeneuve was in three separate collisions; he clashed with Barrichello on lap 1, Robert Doornbos on lap 4, and Tiago Monteiro on lap 27.

Classification

Qualifying

Race

Championship standings after the race

Drivers' Championship standings

Constructors' Championship standings

Note: Only the top five positions are included for both sets of standings.

See also 
 2005 Hockenheimring GP2 Series round

References

German Grand Prix
Grand Prix
German Grand Prix
July 2005 sports events in Europe